Faugh is a small village situated to the East of the City of Carlisle and within 15 minutes of the Scottish Border. The village has always been English however the land of Cumberland was once Scottish with The String of Horses Inn pre-dating the Jacobites rising (1660).

Villages in Cumbria
Hayton, Carlisle